Mata Gabin is an actress, author, and actress of theatre, born in 1972 in Toulépleu, Ivory Coast. She is of French nationality.

Biography 
She was born on the border of Liberia and Ivory Coast, to a Liberian-Guinean mother and a father from Martinique. She was adopted at three years of age by her uncle and her aunt from Corsica. At an early age, Gabin was cared for by her Argentinian grandmother and her Italian husband. She has now been living in Paris for more than ten years and has played various roles in both theater and film. Gabin also writes her own scripts, preferably at dusk. She is a highly professional artist but is also known as being "down to earth", with a great sense of humor.

Theater

Filmography

See also
 Cinema of France

External links 

 Mata Gabin Official Site

1972 births
French film actresses
French television actresses
Living people
Actresses from Paris
French people of Guinean descent
French people of Liberian descent
French people of Martiniquais descent
French people of Argentine descent
French stage actresses
French adoptees
21st-century French actresses